Goodwin Sands is a  sandbank at the southern end of the North Sea lying  off the Deal coast in Kent, England. The area consists of a layer of approximately  depth of fine sand resting on an Upper Chalk platform belonging to the same geological feature that incorporates the White Cliffs of Dover. Tides and currents are constantly shifting the shoals.

More than 2,000 ships are believed to have been wrecked upon the Goodwin Sands because they lie close to the major shipping lanes through the Straits of Dover.  The few miles between the sands and the coast is also a safe anchorage, known as The Downs, used as a refuge from foul weather.  Due to the dangers, the area – which also includes Brake Bank – is marked by numerous lightvessels and buoys.

Several naval battles have been fought nearby, including the Battles of the Goodwin Sands in 1602 and in 1652, and the Battle of Dover Strait in 1917.

When hovercraft ran from Pegwell Bay, Ramsgate, they used to make occasional trips over the Sands, where boats could not safely go.

Southeast from Goodwin Sands lies the Sandettie Bank.

Navigational aids

The East Goodwin lightship guards the end of the Sands on the farthest part out, to warn ships. It is the only remaining lightship of the five which once guarded the sands. The sands were once covered by three lighthouses on the Kent mainland with only North Foreland lighthouse still in operation. South Foreland lighthouse, once known as South Foreland Upper lighthouse is now owned by the National Trust. This once worked with the nearby South Foreland Low lighthouse, also known as Old St Margaret's Lighthouse. When the two South Foreland lights were in alignment ships’ crews would know that they had reached the South-most extent of the sandbank. When the Goodwin sands shifted, South Foreland Low was decommissioned and replaced by the South Goodwin Lightvessel. The first of these ships was bombed by the Germans and sank on 25 October 1940. The replacement vessel, LV90 sank on 27 November 1954, when cables to her two sea anchors broke in a hurricane-force storm. The wreck of the lightship can still be seen at low tide. The next replacement South Goodwin Lightvessel was decommissioned and was towed away on 26 July 2006.

Island of Lomea
In 1817, borings in connection with a plan by Trinity Board to erect a lighthouse on the Sands revealed, beneath fifteen feet of sand, a stratum identified by Charles Lyell as London clay lying upon a chalk basement. Based on this, Lyell proposed that the Sands were the eroded remains of a clay island similar to Sheppey, rather than a mere shifting of the sea bottom shaped by currents and tides.

Lyell's assessment was uncritically followed until the mid-20th century, and enlarged upon by G. B. Gattie who asserted, based on unsourced legends, that the sands were once the fertile low-lying island of Lomea, which he equated with an island said to be known to the Romans as Infera Insula ("Low Island"). This, Gattie said, was owned in the first half of the 11th century by Godwin, Earl of Wessex, after whom the Sands are named. When he fell from favour, the land was supposedly given to St. Augustine's Abbey, Canterbury, whose abbot failed to maintain the sea walls, leading to the island's destruction, some say, in the storm of 1099 mentioned in the Anglo-Saxon Chronicle. However, the island is not mentioned in the Domesday Book, suggesting that if it existed it may have been inundated before the Domesday Book was compiled in 1085–86. The earliest written record of the name "Lomea" seems to be in the De Rebus Albionicis (published 1590) by John Twyne, but no authority for the island's existence is given.  There is a brief mention of a sea-tide inundation in 1092 creating the Godwin sands in a 19th-century book of agricultural records, reissued in 1969.

The modern geological view is that the island of Lomea probably never existed. Although the area now covered by sands and sea was once dry land, the Strait of Dover opened in the Weald-Artois chalk range in prehistory – between around 7600 BC and 5000 BC – not within historical time.

Another theory about the origin of the name is that the sands' name came from Anglo-Saxon gōd wine = "good friend", an ironic name given by sailors, or because ships can shelter from storms in deep water called The Roads between the Goodwin Sands and the coast.

Notable events

17th century
 John, the son of Phineas Pett of Chatham, was involved in an ordeal in the beginning of October 1624, when occurred:  Phineas Pett received news of the shipwreck at Deal, and was dispatched by the Lord Admiral to attend to the ship and use his best means to save her. He used chain pumps, replaced the rudder, and fitted jury masts, by which effort she was safely brought to Deptford Dock.
 In October 1630, the Stella was sunk in a storm off Goodwin Sands. The ship was carrying nearly 300 Scottish and English soldiers from the Dutch Republic to the Republic of Venice for use in the War of the Mantuan Succession. All of the soldiers, including their commander, Colonel Sir John Swinton, drowned.
 In 1690 HMS Vanguard, a 90-gun second-rate ship of the line, struck the Sands, but was fortunate enough to be got off by the boatmen of Deal.

18th and 19th centuries
Great storm of 1703

In the great storm of 1703 at least 13 men-of-war and 40 merchant vessels were wrecked in The Downs, with the loss of 2,168 lives and 708 guns. Yet, to their credit, the Deal boatmen were able to rescue 200 men from this ordeal.

Naval vessels lost to the sands included:
 , Deptford built, and from there locally manned, lost with all hands
 , Deptford built, and from there locally manned, lost with all hands
 , a 70-gun third-rate built at Deptford in 1679
 The Woolwich fourth-rate , totally overwhelmed with the loss of 343 men
 The boom ship HMS Mortar, lost with all 65 of her crew.

1740
The Dutch merchant ship "Rooswijk", on her way to Cape of Good Hope and the East Indies, fell victim on the Goodwin Sands to a storm on the 8th of January 1740. It sank with the loss of everyone on board, almost 250 sailors, soldiers and passengers. The silty environment has preserved the wreck for so long, however, shifting tidal flows started to expose the timbers and goods and thus spurred its salvage in 2017 by Historic England and the Cultural Heritage Agency of the Netherlands.

1748
According to legend the Lady Lovibond was wrecked on the Goodwin Sands on 13 February 1748, amidst alleged controversy over the cause of her sinking in which all hands were lost. She is said to reappear every fifty years as a ghost ship. No references to the shipwreck are known to exist in contemporary records or sources, including newspapers, Lloyd's List or Lloyd's Register.

1809
 was wrecked in January 1809, with her cargo, a large number of East India Company X and XX copper cash coins, belonging to Matthew Boulton.  The wreck was found in 1984 and some coins were salvaged in 1985 during a licensed dive.

1851
The brig  was wrecked on the Sands in a storm in 1851; the lifeboat from Broadstairs rescued seven men of her crew.

1857
The mail paddle steamer SS The Violet was driven onto the sands during a storm on 5 January 1857 with the loss of seventeen crew, a mail guard, and one passenger.

20th century
The Belgian cargo ship  was wrecked on the sands in 1907.

On the 16th January 1916, Admiralty Tug HM Tug Char sank after a collision with the Steamship Frivan in the area around South Goodwin Light Vessel.

Two ships named  ran aground on the Sands, one in 1909 and the other in 1939.

The US cargo steamer (and former Liberty Ship) , battered by a gale, ran aground on Goodwin Sands on 12 September 1946. The ship broke her back on or about 21 September 1946, and was soon in two pieces. During 1947, both pieces were subsequently refloated and towed to port for scrapping.

The passenger ship  collided with the freighter Prospector near the Sands in June 1953, severely damaging and nearly sinking her.

The Radio Caroline vessel  drifted onto the Sands in November 1991, effectively ending the era of offshore pirate radio in Britain.

21st century
On 10 June 2013, a Dornier Do 17 Z2 was raised from Goodwin Sands. The German bomber had made an emergency landing in the sea over the Sands on 26 August 1940 after a bombing raid. Two of the four-man crew were killed on impact, the remaining crew becoming POWs. The Dornier was located on the Sands in September 2008 and plans were made to recover it, as it is one of two surviving aircraft of this type.

The salvage started on 3 May 2013 with the plane destined eventually for RAF Hendon in 2015, though poor weather and the position of the plane on chalk rather than the silt expected caused the plan to be amended to attaching ropes to three points on the fuselage.
The plane was finally lifted on 10 June 2013.
It is believed to be from 7 Staffel, III Gruppe/KG3 (7th Sqn of 3rd Group of Bomber Wing 3) operating from Sint-Truiden aerodrome 60 km east of Brussels, shot down on 26 August 1940 by a Boulton Paul Defiant of No. 264 Squadron RAF, based in Hornchurch, either one crewed by Desmond Hughes and Fred Gash or one of the three 264 Squadron aircraft shot down soon after in a battle with Bf 109E fighter escorts of the German fighter wing JG 3.

Potential port or airport site
The August 1969 issue of Dock and Harbour Authority magazine carried an article 'A National Roadstead' which reported on a 1968 proposal to the Ministry of Transport for reclaiming the Goodwin Sands and constructing a deep water port on them.

In 1985, consultants Sir Bruce White Wolfe Barry and Partners promoted a proposal for developing an International Freeport combined with a two-runway airport located on three reclaimed islands on the sands.
  In 2003, the idea was still under consideration. Being far from residential areas it has the advantage of 24-hour-a-day take-offs and landings without causing disturbance.

In December 2012, the Goodwin Sands were once again promoted as a potential site for a £39 billion 24-hour airport to become the UK's hub airport.  Engineering firm Beckett Rankine believes their proposals for up to five offshore runways at Goodwin Airport are the 'most sustainable solution' with the 'least adverse impact' when compared to other options that have been proposed for the expansion of runway capacity in the southeast. They claim that this is due to the absence of statutory environmental protection on the Goodwin Sands and the alignment of the runways which avoids any overflying of the coast.

Cricket
In the summer of 1824, Captain K. Martin, then the Harbourmaster at Ramsgate, instituted the proceedings of the first known cricket match on the Goodwin Sands at low water. An annual cricket match was played on the sands until 2003, and a crew filming a reconstruction of this for the BBC television series Coast had to be rescued by the Ramsgate lifeboat when they got into difficulty in 2006.

When the Royal Marines School of Music was based at Deal, it played a game of cricket on a suitable day each summer.

Athletics
On 23 June 1994, Deal Striders hosted a 1-mile race on the Goodwin Sands in memory of the late Cliff Temple. Around 100 athletes and spectators set off from Dover on a cross channel hovercraft and landed on the sands at low water. A one-mile circuit was setup on the sands and the race started. In a punishing wind, the event was won by Matt de Freitas, with London Marathon winner Mike Gratton 2nd, and Olympic Steeplechaster Tom Buckner 3rd

Controversial dredging

Following a two-year public consultation the Marine Management Organisation (MMO) granted Dover Harbour Board a licence to dredge 3 million tonnes of aggregate from the Goodwin Sands on 26 July 2018.

Literary references
William Shakespeare mentions the Sands in The Merchant of Venice, Act 3 Scene 1:
Why, yet it lives there uncheck'd that Antonio hath a ship of rich lading wrecked on the narrow seas; the Goodwins, I think they call the place; a very dangerous flat and fatal, where the carcasses of many a tall ship lie buried, as they say, if my gossip Report be an honest woman of her word.

William Shakespeare mentions Goodwin Sands in King John, Act 5 Scene 5:

 Messenger:The Count Melun is slain; the English Lords\ By his persuasion are again fall'n off,\ And your supply, which you have wish'd so long,\ Are cast away and sunk on Goodwin Sands.

Mary Wroth refers to Goodwin Sands as a place of shipwreck in her sonnet sequence Pamphilia to Amphilanthus (1621):
Like to a Ship on Goodwins cast by winde, / The more shee strive, more deepe in Sand is prest... (Sonnet 6, 5-6).

Herman Melville mentions them in Moby-Dick, Chapter VII, "The Chapel":
In what census of living creatures, the dead of mankind are included; why it is that a universal proverb says of them, that they tell no tales, though containing more secrets than the Goodwin Sands...

R. M. Ballantyne, the Scottish writer of adventure stories, published The Floating Light of the Goodwin Sands in 1870.

W. H. Auden quotes the phrase "to set up shop on Goodwin Sands" in his poem In Sickness and in Health. This is a proverbial expression meaning to be shipwrecked.

G. K. Chesterton's poem The Rolling English Road refers to "the night we went to Glastonbury by way of Goodwin Sands."

Charles Spurgeon mentions them in The Soul Winner, chapter 15 "Encouragement to Soul-Winners."
Their theology shifts like the Goodwin Sands, and they regard all firmness as so much bigotry.

Ian Fleming refers to the Goodwin Sands in Moonraker (1955), one of the James Bond novels, as well as making them a major plot point in his children's story Chitty-Chitty-Bang-Bang (1964–65).

The sands are depicted in the 1929 film The Lady from the Sea, which is sometimes known by the title of Goodwin Sands.

In the 2014 biographical film Mr. Turner, the first husband of the housekeeper Mrs. Booth is mentioned as having died in a boating accident at Goodwin Sands.

"Old Goodman's Farm", appearing in the Rudyard Kipling poem Brookland Road refers to the Goodwin Sands and the legend of their origin as an island belonging to Earl Godwin.

In the novel The Shivering Sands by Victoria Holt the Goodwin sands play a major plot point and the masts from wrecked ships are often sighted from the shore.

In Patrick O'Brian's Post Captain, Stephen Maturin explores the sands and must dive for his boots as the tide floods.

In the short story "Flood on the Goodwins" (1933) by Arthur Durham Divine, on a foggy night during the First World War, a German saboteur orders a British mariner at gunpoint to take him to the coast of Belgium. Instead, the mariner circles for hours and then, telling the saboteur they have reached Belgium, strands the German at low tide on the Goodwins, six miles from shore, knowing that the tide will drown the villain.

In Julian Stockwin's Invasion the Sands are both a hindrance and protection for the British fleet assembled for the rapid deployment against Napoleon's invasion armada. The protagonist Kydd even takes part in the rescue of a merchantman vessel being gale forced onto the Sands.

In Henry Williamson's The Dark Lantern, Richard Maddison's landlady lost her husband on the 'Benvenue' at The Goodwins during 'the great March gale of eighteen seventy one'.

See also
 Varne Bank
 Walmer and Deal lifeboats
 Maasvlakte for a notorious "ship swallower" sandbank which has now been reclaimed and is now land and part of a port.

References

Further reading
 Richard Larn and Bridget Larn – Shipwrecks of the Goodwin Sands (Meresborough Books, 1995) 
 Steve Conway – Shiprocked – Life On The Waves With Radio Caroline (Liberties Press, Dublin, 2009)   (author gives his account of running aground on the Goodwin Sands and helicopter rescue)
 Raymond Lamont Brown – 'Phantoms of the Sea' (Taplinger Publishing Company, NY 1972)

External links
 Ross Revenge Plans -Live TV Broadcast of the Ross Revenge stranded on the Goodwin Sands
 goodwin-sands 2009 survey  from United Kingdom Hydrographic Office (at Yumpu.com) PDF-File, 52 pages
 An historical sketch, including a map of the sands and their environs
 Historic Deal information on the Goodwin Sands
 Additional information on Goodwin Sands etymology

Deal, Kent
English Channel
Landforms of Kent
Lighthouses of the English Channel
Sandbanks of England
Ship graveyards
Thanet